Emilio Nicolás Commisso (born 5 November 1956 in Córdoba) is a former Argentine footballer. He played for a number of clubs in Argentina and Spain.

Commisso started his professional career in 1976 with River Plate. During his seven years playing at the club, they won five league titles. Commisso played 218 league games for River, scoring 27 goals.

In 1984, he joined Argentinos Juniors, he played for the club during their golden age, winning two league titles the Copa Libertadores 1985 and the Copa Interamericana, they also played in the Copa Intercontinental against Juventus of Italy.

Commisso left Argentinos in 1988 to join Talleres de Córdoba but he only stayed one season before joining Xerez in Spain.

Commisso returned to Argentina to play for Estudiantes de La Plata and his last club was Quilmes Atlético Club between 1991 and 1992.

Titles as a player
River Plate
 Metropolitano: 1977, 1979, 1980, 1984
 Nacional: 1979, 1981, 1985

Argentinos Juniors
 Copa Libertadores: 1985
 Copa Interamericana: 1985

Coaching career
Trayectoria DT Profesional
 
Director Técnico Alterno – Instituto Atlético Central Córdoba – (1998–1999)
Director Técnico Alterno – Club Atlético Talleres – Primera División (1999–2000)
Director Técnico Alterno – Unión de Santa Fe – Primera División (2000–2001)
Director Técnico Alterno – Rosario Central – Primera División (2001–2002)
Manager General – Club Racing de Avellaneda (2002 –2005)
Director Técnico – Club Racing de Avellaneda
Director Técnico – Club Atlético Talleres – Nacional "B" (2005)
Director técnico alterno Club  Beitar Jerusalem, Israel (2006)
Director técnico alterno Club Atlético Huracán (2007)
Director técnico alterno Club Cerro Porteño, Asunción, Paraguay 2008)

Commisso has held a number of positions at Racing Club including club secretary, co-ordinator of football and interim manager in 2003. In 2005, he was approached to take over as manager of Talleres de Córdoba.

References

1956 births
Living people
Footballers from Córdoba, Argentina
Argentine footballers
Argentine expatriate footballers
Association football midfielders
Club Atlético River Plate footballers
Argentinos Juniors footballers
Talleres de Córdoba footballers
Xerez CD footballers
Estudiantes de La Plata footballers
Quilmes Atlético Club footballers
Argentine Primera División players
Expatriate footballers in Spain
Argentine football managers
Racing Club de Avellaneda managers
Talleres de Córdoba managers
Argentine expatriate sportspeople in Spain